Blokhino is a rural locality (a village) in Akberdinsky Selsoviet, Iglinsky District, Bashkortostan, Russia. The population was 41 as of 2010. There are 10 streets.

Geography 
Blokhino is located 47 km southwest of Iglino (the district's administrative centre) by road. Akberdino is the nearest rural locality.

References 

Rural localities in Iglinsky District